Claire Shepherd  (born 17 February 1975) is a British former professional tennis player. She competed during her career as Claire Taylor.

A left-handed player from Oxfordshire, Taylor reached a best ranking of 183 in the world during her career.

Taylor made three singles appearances in the main draw of Wimbledon, the first in 1994 when she came up against Martina Navratilova. She won through to the second round once, in 1996, after beating Joanne Ward in a match between two British wildcards.

ITF finals

Singles: 6 (2–4)

Doubles: 7 (3–4)

References

External links
 
 

1975 births
Living people
British female tennis players
English female tennis players
Tennis people from Oxfordshire
Sportspeople from Banbury